Mo Chit may refer to:

 Mo Chit Bus Terminal, a former bus station in Bangkok
 Mo Chit 2, the colloquial name for the Bangkok Bus Terminal (Chatuchak), which succeeded Mo Chit
 Mo Chit BTS Station, a station of the BTS Skytrain